Châtres is a commune in the Seine-et-Marne department in the Île-de-France region in north-central France.

History
Châtres began as a Roman camp. Its name, formerly Chastres, is derived from Latin castrum.

Châtres is documented as the place where Saint Corbinian was born circa 670 and where he maintained a hermitage for fourteen years.

Demographics
The inhabitants of Châtres are called Châtriots. As of 2017, its population is 678.

Places of interest
Place of interest include the Château de Boulayes and its park.

Agriculture
The area produces cereal grain.

See also
Communes of the Seine-et-Marne department

References

  Commune de Châtres

External links

 Old postcards of Châtres
 Find Châtres on the map of Seine-et-Marne
 1999 Land Use, from IAURIF (Institute for Urban Planning and Development of the Paris-Île-de-France region)
 

Communes of Seine-et-Marne